VIP Brother 7, also known as VIP Brother: 100% напудрен (lit. 100% powdered) was the seventh season of the Bulgarian reality television series VIP Brother, hosted by Niki Kanchev. The show launched on 13 September 2015 on Nova TV. Niki Kanchev and Aleksandra Sarchadjieva were the main presenters. It concluded 62 days later on 13 November 2015. Georgi "Gino" Tashev won with Ernestina Shinova as the runner-up.

Housemates
12 Housemates entered the House on Day 1. They were joined by 3 other Housemates on Day 2.

Deyan 
Deyan Topalski is a sportsman. He entered the house on Day 1 and was the third evicted on Day 23.

Ernestina 
Ernestina Shinova is an actress. Her husband Andrey Slabakov entered the VIP Brother 3 in 2009 as a guest star. She entered the house on Day 1 and finished second in the finale on Day 62.

Georgi 
Georgi Tashev "Gino Biancalana" - "White wool" is a businessman. He entered the house on Day 2 on the village (Old House), where the finalists of the previous Big Brother 5 season stayed. He eventually was allowed to enter the main house (New House), to join the main group of housemates and became a winner on Day 62.

Ivo 
Ivo Tanev is a TV host and operah and pop-folk singer. He entered the house on Day 1 and was the seventh evicted on Day 51.

Katrin 
Katrin Vacheva is a former participant of the Bulgarian version of Playboy Playmate. She entered the house on Day 2 on the village (Old House), where the finalists of the previous Big Brother 5 season stayed. She eventually was allowed to enter the main house (New House), to join the main group of housemates and she was the sixth evicted on Day 44.

Kichka 
Kichka Bodurova is a famous singer. She entered the house on Day 1 and finished third in the finale on Day 62.

Kristina 
Kristina Dimitrova is a famous singer. She entered the house on Day 2 on the village (Old House), where the finalists of the previous Big Brother 5 season stayed. She eventually was allowed to enter the main house (New House), to join the main group of housemates and she was the ninth evicted on Day 60.

Luna 
Luna Yordanova is a pop-folk singer. She entered the house on Day 1 and was the fifth evicted on Day 37.

Lyudmil 
Lyudmil Ilarionov "Lyusi" is a director and pop and pop-folk singer. He entered the house on Day 1 and was the tenth evicted on Day 60.

Miroslav 
Miroslav Stoyanov "Dzhordzhano" is an amateur artist and songwriter, gained considerable popularity on the Internet with unconventional performances posted on YouTube. He entered the house on Day 1 and was the second evicted on Day 16.

Monika 
Monika Valerieva Krasteva is a former participant of the Bulgarian version of Playboy Playmate, Miss Playmate 2011 Bulgaria, finished third place. She entered the house on Day 1 and was the fourth evicted on Day 30.

Petya 

Petya Ivanova "Preslava" is a famous pop-folk singer. She entered the VIP Brother 3 in 2009 as a guest star. She entered the house on Day 1 and decided to walk out of the House on Day 18. She was allowed to re-enter the House on Day 37, but only as a guest star and left in the finale on Day 62.

Plamen 
Plamen Bogdanov was a housemate in Big Brother 5. He entered the house on Day 1 on the village (Old House), where the finalists of his season stayed. He eventually was allowed to enter the main house (New House), to join the main group of housemates and was the first evicted on Day 9.

Riton 

Riton (with members Ekaterina Mihaylova "Katya" and Zdravko Zhelyazkov) are famous pop duet. They entered the house on Day 1 and finished fifth in the finale on Day 62.

Stanimir 
Stanimir Gumov "Gumata" is an actor. He entered the house on Day 1 and finished fourth in the finale on Day 62.

Svetlana 
Svetlana Vasileva is a former participant of the Bulgarian version of Playboy Playmate, Miss Playmate 2009 Bulgaria, finished second place. She entered the house on Day 1 and was the eighth evicted on Day 58.

Nominations table

Notes 

 : As Anita, Ekaterina, Katrin, Kiril and Kristina were in the Old House they were immune.
 : After he was evicted, Plamen gave immunity to Georgi.
 : After he was evicted, Miroslav gave immunity to Stanimir.
 : Katrin and Kristina were immune and exempt to nominate since they recently entered the Main House.
 : Monika and Luna were immune because of a conspirancy.
 : After he was evicted, Deyan gave immunity to duet Riton.
 : After she was evicted, Monika gave immunity to Ernestina.
 : After she was evicted, Luna gave immunity to Kristina.
 : At the start of the live show, the nominated housemates - Ernestina, Ivo, Katrin and Kichka played a nomination game. Kichka was the winner and saved herself from possible eviction.
 : After she was evicted, Katrin gave immunity to Kristina.
 : After he was evicted, Ivo gave immunity to Ernestina.
 : During the eighth and final nominations, the housemates had to first vote for who they wanted to win (the name in ) and second for who they didn't want to win (the name in black). They were not able to vote for themselves.

References

External links
 Official website

2015 Bulgarian television seasons
VIP 7
2015 Bulgarian television series endings